Tapio Kinnunen (born 18 January 1954) is a Finnish weightlifter. He competed in the men's middleweight event at the 1980 Summer Olympics. Kinnunen moved to Sweden in 1975, and also has represented Sweden in competitions.

References

External links
 

1954 births
Living people
Finnish male weightlifters
Olympic weightlifters of Finland
Weightlifters at the 1980 Summer Olympics
Sportspeople from North Ostrobothnia
Finnish emigrants to Sweden